Alasdair Caimbeul (born 27 May 1941), also known as Alasdair a' Bhocsair or Alasdair Campbell, is a Scottish playwright, short story writer, and novelist from Ness on the Isle of Lewis.

Life 
He was born on 27 May 1941 in Ness, Lewis. His brother, Tormod Caimbeul (Tormod A' Bhocsair), was also a writer. Their father was Aonghas Caimbeul (Am Bocsair), and their uncle was another notable Scottish Gaelic writer, Aonghas Caimbeul "Am Puilean", as is his niece, Catrìona Lexy Chaimbeul. He lived in Drochaid Chonain in Ross-shire in the 1990s, and was living in Ness as of 2001.

Literary work 
He has written plays, short stories, and novels in Scottish Gaelic and in English. He began to write in Gaelic in 1984. Bùth a' Bhaile ("the store of the town") was his first play. He was involved with theater companies, among them 'Na Nisich' in Lewis and Cluicheadairean Loch Aillse. From 1988 to 1990 he was a writer-in-residence at Sabhal Mòr Ostaig on the Isle of Skye. He wrote the novels The Nessman and Visiting the Bard in English.

He won the Stornoway Gazette Award for new play in 2009 at the Royal National Mòd.

His novel Ro Fhada san t-Suidheachadh Seo won the first prize at the 2015 Donald Meek Awards.

Gaelic publications 
 1995. Cha Sgeul Ruin E: Taghadh De Sgeulachdan O Chaochladh ùghdaran, Acair, 
 1989. le Aonghas MacDhòmhnaill Murchadh agus Am Bradan Steòrnabhagh: Acair
 nobhail don òigridh
 1990. Trì dealbhan-cluiche Slèite, An t-Eilean Sgitheanach: Clò Ostaig 
 Ro-ràdh (dha Magaidh Choineagan)
 Bùth a' Bhaile
 A' Home Brew
 Dol a dh'fhaicinn Nighean an Rìgh
 1992. Am Fear Meadhanach Conon Bridge: Druim Fraoich  (nobhail)
 1999. Lìontan sgaoilte Slèite, [An t-Eilean Sgitheanach]: Cànan 
 2011. Cuid a' chorra-ghrithich Inbhir Nis: Clàr 
 2011. Sia Dealbhan-cluiche Inbhir Nis: Clàr 
 An staffroom 
 Toiseach an earraich 
 An sgrìobhaiche 
 'S e seo do bheatha 
 Na craoladairean 
 Am fear a chaidh dhan eilean.
 2015. Ro Fhada san t-Suidheachadh Seo. Winner of the first prize at the Donald Meek Awards

English publications 
 2000. The Nessman, Edinburgh:Birlinn, 
 2003. Visiting the Bard, Edinburgh: Polygon,

References

External links 
 Interview with the BBC. Also at Archive.org
 Review of 'Cuid a' chorra-ghrithich' by R. Black. Published 1 October 2011.

Scottish Gaelic writers
Living people
1941 births
21st-century Scottish writers
Scottish Gaelic dramatists and playwrights
Sabhal Mòr Ostaig
People from the Isle of Skye
People from the Isle of Lewis
People from Ross and Cromarty
20th-century Scottish dramatists and playwrights
21st-century Scottish dramatists and playwrights